The Battle of Happo was a naval engagement on May 7, 1592, one of the three Joseon naval campaigns of 1592 conducted by Korean admiral Yi Sun-sin during Japanese invasions of Korea (1592-1598) against the Japanese forces of Toyotomi Hideyoshi. These campaigns made Yi a legendary figure in Korean history.  The campaigns of Yi were vital in halting the Japanese invasion.

While intending to spend the night in the open sea following the initial Battle of Okpo, Admiral Yi Sun-sin was forced to change his plans due to a report of five large Japanese ships having been sighted heading in the direction of Happo around 5 p.m. He ordered his forces to pursue the Japanese ships, which they caught and destroyed in a small skirmish near Happo. Admiral Yi’s forces now had two victories under their belt.

Citations

Bibliography
 

Happo
Yi Sun-sin